Ulaan Taiga (lit. "red taiga") is a mountain range in north-western Khövsgöl, Mongolia, between the Darkhad Valley and Mongolia's border with Tuva, Russia. The range covers parts of the Ulaan-Uul, Tsagaannuur and Bayanzürkh sums.  Notable peaks include Mt. Lam Taiga (2619m) and Mt. Belchir (3351m). The Shishged River and the Delgermörön have their sources in this area. A part of the area along the border with Tuva has been put under natural protection.

References
M. Nyamaa, Khövsgöl aimgiin lavlakh toli, Ulaanbaatar 2001, p. 145
G. Tseepil, Hovsgol Aimag Map, Ulaanbaatar (?) 2006 (?)
Jens Geu, Wanderführer Mongolei, Köngen 2008, p. 123 (shows a Russian topographic map)

Mountain ranges of Mongolia
Khövsgöl Province